Brianne West (born ) is a New Zealand entrepreneur and the founder of Ethique, the world's first zero-waste beauty brand. In 2016 she was named a "Global Thinker" by Foreign Policy magazine.

Early business
West founded her first company, a pet detective agency, at age eight. She started her first natural cosmetics business as a high-school leaver at the age of 19, and ran it for five years before starting a confectionery company.

West began creating solid-bar shampoo and conditioner in her kitchen as a hobby in 2012, while in the second year of her Bachelor of Science degree at the University of Canterbury, in Christchurch, New Zealand. West used the knowledge from her studies to formulate products with natural ingredients from ethical and sustainable sources. By removing water from the products, West created a range of completely plastic-free products which were also not tested on animals, and were sold in biodegradable and compostable packaging. Later the same year she started marketing the bars under the company name of Sorbet Cosmetics.

Ethique 

In 2013, she entered a business entrepreneurship competition at her university called "entré". As a result of becoming a finalist she secured a business mentor.

By 2015, her company had prevented 60,000 bottles from needing to be recycled and West re-branded the company as Ethique.

In 2015, West launched an online crowdfunding campaign through PledgeMe, which raised NZ$200,000, and attracted the largest number of female investors in the site's history. The funds were used to build a customised laboratory for developing and manufacturing products, and to expand the company to global markets. She expanded the range of products to include solid body wash, face creams and moisturisers, deodorants, self-tanning bars, household cleaning products and pet wash.   In 2017, West launched a second crowdfunding campaign and reached PledgeMe's daily limit of NZ$500,000 in 90 minutes. In 2019 the company had a turnover of more than $10 million a year.

In 2020, West was named as an Obama Foundation Leader and as One Young World Entrepreneur of the Year. Ethique also officially achieved 10 million bottles saved from use and West announced a new goal of half a billion by 2030. Ethique is now found in more than 20 countries including Australia, United States, Taiwan, and Hong Kong, as well as ships worldwide. In 2019, the company expanded operations to stores in the UK.

Products 
The company makes a range of solid hair, face and body bars. All products are sold in compostable packaging, meaning zero consumer waste. Ethique only uses biodegradable ingredients and wrappers so its solid bars leave no trace on the planet. Consumers can dispose of the compostable wrapping in their home compost bin. This means there are no bottles, jars, lids or pump dispensers contributing to landfill or oceanic pollution. Other product features include natural ingredients such as coconut oil, cocoa butter, kiwifruit seed oil, essential oils, as well as ingredients with low-to-no preservatives.

Awards and recognition 

 2020: Time magazine 100 Best Inventions of 2020 – Ethique Concentrates
2020: One Young World Young Entrepreneur of the Year
2020: Obama Leader Asia Pacific
2019: NZI Sustainable Business Network Awards, Communication for Change commendation
2019: New Zealand Women of Influence Awards, Business Enterprise winner
2019: Deloitte Fast 50, ranked fourth fasted growing company in New Zealand
2019: Westpac Champion Business Awards, ChristchurchNZ Champion Innovation winner and the Westpac Champion Supreme Awards Small Enterprise winner
2019: New Zealand Young Entrepreneur of the Year (Ernst & Young)
 2019: American Chamber of Commerce (New Zealand) DHL Express – Exporter of the Year to the USA $1 million to $10 million
 2018: Kiwibank Local Hero Award
 2018: Kiwibank Innovator of the Year, semi-finalist
 2016: Top 100 leading "Global Thinkers" in the American Foreign Policy magazine
 2016: Vital Voices by Bank of America mentee
 2016: East-West Center's Changing Faces Women's Leadership Seminar, participant
 2016: EY Entrepreneurial Winning Women, participant
 2015: Deloitte's "Rising Star – One to Watch"
 2015: New Zealand Green Apple Awards (for environmental best practice), silver

References

External links 
Ethique homepage

Living people
University of Canterbury alumni
People from Christchurch
New Zealand businesspeople
21st-century New Zealand people
New Zealand women in business
1980s births
New Zealand Women of Influence Award recipients